Amos Fortune is a fictional character appearing in American comic books published by DC Comics.

Publication history
Amos Fortune first appeared in Justice League of America #6 (August–September 1961) and was created by Gardner Fox and Mike Sekowsky.

Fictional character biography

Pre-Crisis
As a child, Fortune was the leader of a gang of juvenile delinquents. As an adult, he became obsessed with luck, both good and bad, and discovered the existence of "luck glands" in human beings that dictate how a person's luck will run. Upon learning how to control these "luck glands" to manipulate his luck, he gathered his old gang and created the original Royal Flush Gang who battled the Justice League of America on two occasions. Professor Fortune first met the Justice League trying to remove their "good luck" but was defeated.

Fortune continued to battle the Justice League of America several times. At first, he acted as the leader of the Royal Flush Gang, though he abandoned them soon after. In their place, he created the short-lived Luck League, a group who could mimmick the powers of the JLA. Still later, Fortune battled Justice League Europe, but was again defeated when his luck ran out.

Villains United
When Parademon blew up the House of Secrets in Villains United #6 (2005), Fortune suffered injuries that left him blind in one eye and half his face disfigured. Fortune covered up his disfigured face with a mask. His attempt to escape Enclave M in Villains United Infinite Crisis Special, was foiled by the Secret Six. Interrogated while dangling out of a helicopter, by Knockout, he revealed the fact that the Secret Society was planning an all-out assault on Metropolis. After he insulted Knockout's lover Scandal, Amos was thrown from the airplane. As he fell, Amos regretted he could not use his talents for the betterment of mankind along with insulting Scandal.

Post-Infinite Crisis
As of JSA Classified #14-16, it seems that Fortune survived the helicopter fall and is now masterminding a plot against the JSA using the Wizard as a focusing point for the 'luck magicks' - a.k.a. stellaration energy - in order to destroy the JSA, using Wildcat as his mind-controlled pawn (who is growing stronger with each victory over a JSA member via the stellaration energy). Vixen and Gypsy helped Stargirl against this plot, given they had faced him before many years ago while on a training mission as then-new recruits of the JLA, alongside Martian Manhunter, Aquaman, Vibe, and Steel (Vibe and Steel were also new recruits at the time), as they fought both the previous and then-new incarnations of the Royal Flush Gang, as seen in flashback in JLA Classified #22-25.

Amos's origin was revised and revisited in Justice League #35-37; it stated that he became obsessed with playing cards and luck upon the death of his father, a gambler who was murdered by the mob after he failed to pay a debt. Growing up in poverty and tormented over his weight, Amos developed a ruthless streak as he used his knowledge of games of chance to fleece his classmates of their money. The original Royal Flush Gang were retconned as his enforcers, then gang members as they began robbing local stores. The group eventually were brought into the service of a local mafia don, who further trained them in crime. When the don found out about Amos's skill at cards, he charged Amos with the task of shaking down a private poker party being held for a group of wealthy gamblers. Amos's skill allowed him to beat the wealthy card players, but after winning a rather large pot with a royal flush, the wealthy gamblers decided to kill Amos rather than let him collect his winnings. However, Amos and his gang (who had come with him) fought back and killed the wealthy gamblers, taking their money for themselves, to finance the creation of the Royal Flush gang.

The new origin claimed that Amos was the original "Ace" of the Royal Flush Gang, and that after several battles, where the group barely escaped from the Justice League, Amos and the group decided to "expand" the Royal Flush gang; franchising the villain group (which in turn explains away the many different variations of the group) with Amos Fortune becoming a kingpin figure over his crime empire.

Using his many incarnations of the Royal Flush Gang, Amos and Roulette become involved in a twisted game where Roulette bets that Amos's Royal Flush Gang syndicate can't beat the Justice League, which had recently seen its ranks decimated following the events of Final Crisis. The League defeats Fortune's gang, but he and Roulette manage to escape. Fortune is later called to a warehouse by the wife of a Gang member he had killed earlier in the story, to keep him from testifying against him. The woman shoots him in the face at point-blank range.

The New 52
The events of the rebooting of the DC Universe following Flashpoint resulted in Amos Fortune's history being changed. While the Royal Flush Gang syndicate is still shown as active, the group's connection to Amos Fortune was erased. Writer Geoff Johns teased the official introduction of Amos Fortune at the end of the AMAZO Virus arc, in Justice League #39, as Amos Fortune is seen in shadows; a corporate executive who gained unstated powers following exposure to the AMAZO virus.

Powers and abilities
Amos Fortune was a very talented gambler, able to use whatever cards dealt to him, either by random or rigged, to his advantage in practically any game he participates, regardless how much the odds were stacked against him. Fortune was also a formidable hand-to-hand fighter, having learned to defend himself at an early age. He was also a genius-level inventor and armorer, having discovered the existence of "Luck Glands" and how to exploit them to one's advantage after acquiring odds-altering technology (that he had his subordinates steal from a high-tech casino in Las Vegas) to manufacture equippable "Stimoluck" devices that can tilt a person's chances of good luck probability.

In other media
Amos Fortune appears in the tenth season of Smallville, portrayed by James Kidnie.

References

External links
Unofficial Guide to the DC Universe entry

DC Comics male supervillains
Comics characters introduced in 1961
Characters created by Gardner Fox
Fictional businesspeople